"Kick Out the Jams" is a song by MC5, released as a single in March 1969 by Elektra Records. The album of the same name caused some controversy due to Sinclair's inflammatory liner notes and the  track's rallying cry of "Kick out the jams, motherfuckers!" According to Kramer, the band recorded this as "Kick out the jams, brothers and sisters!" for the single released for radio play; band member Rob Tyner claimed this was done without group consensus. The edited version also appeared in some LP copies, which also withdrew Sinclair's excitable comments. The album was released in January 1969; reviews were mixed, but the album was relatively successful, quickly selling over 100,000 copies and peaking at #30 on the Billboard album chart in May 1969 during a 23-week stay.

When Hudson's, a Detroit-based department store chain, refused to stock the Kick Out the Jams album due to the obscenity, MC5 responded with a full page advertisement in the local underground magazine Fifth Estate saying "Stick Alive with the MC5, and Fuck Hudson's!", prominently including the logo of MC5's label, Elektra Records, in the ad. Hudson's pulled all Elektra records from their stores, and in the ensuing controversy, Jac Holzman, the head of Elektra, dropped the band from their contract. MC5 then signed with Atlantic Records.

Formats and track listing 
US 7" single (EK-45648)
"Kick Out the Jams" (Michael Davis, Wayne Kramer, Fred "Sonic" Smith, Dennis Thompson, Rob Tyner) – 2:37
"Motor City Is Burning" – 4:30

Personnel
Adapted from the Kick Out the Jams liner notes.
Musicians
 Michael Davis – bass guitar, backing vocals
 Wayne Kramer – electric guitar, backing vocals
 Fred "Sonic" Smith – electric guitar, backing vocals
 Dennis Thompson – drums
 Rob Tyner – lead vocals
Production and additional personnel
 Bruce Botnick – production, engineering
 Jac Holzman – production

Charts

Release history

Cover versions

References

External links

1968 songs
1969 singles
Elektra Records singles
MC5 songs
Monster Magnet songs
Rage Against the Machine songs
Song recordings produced by Bruce Botnick
Song recordings produced by Jac Holzman
Songs written by Fred "Sonic" Smith